Publius Mucius Scaevola ( 179–169 BC) was a Roman politician and general.

In 179 BC, as praetor urbanus, he was charged with investigating cases of poisoning in the city of Rome. Scaevola was elected one of the consuls for 175 BC alongside Marcus Aemilius Lepidus. During their term of office, both men campaigned against the Ligurians, and both celebrated triumphs for their successes. Publius's brother Quintus succeeded him in office for the following year.

He was an unsuccessful candidate to the censorship of 169 BC.

References
 
 

2nd-century BC Roman consuls
2nd-century BC Roman generals
2nd-century BC Roman praetors
Scaevola, Publius
Roman triumphators